Bedros Tourian (Armenian: in TAO Պետրոս Դուրեան, in RAO Պետրոս Դուրյան) (1851–1872) was a Western Armenian poet, playwright and actor.

Biography 
Bedros Tourian (alternate spelling: Petros Duryan) was born to a poverty stricken family whose father was a blacksmith in Istanbul. A romantic poet with keen sensitivity, he amassed a beloved following of admirers during his life. He died of tuberculosis at the age of 21. He left, however, a legacy of drama and poetry. A patriot, his historical plays were inspired by a yearning for national liberation. His Armenian school teacher was Hagop Baronian, the satirist. Educated in French, Tourian was well read in Hugo, Lamartine, and de Musset and brought a lyrical and sentimental quality to his native language of Armenian poetry. Spontaneous, eloquent and richly endowed with imagery and metaphors, his poems reveal natural artistic brilliance, and paved the way with innovation from the old style of writing. Critics have credited Tourian with originating the modern lyric tradition in verse. His poetry has been translated into Russian, French, English, German and Italian.

He pursued an active theatrical life, despite his father’s opposition, writing plays and performing on the stage. Given the poverty of his family, the financial advantage that acting afforded him may well have been a factor in defying his father’s wishes. He quickly gained recognition and sustained popularity through his plays. Some of his theatrical works include Black Lands(1868), Artashes the Conqueror (1869), Fall of the House of the Arsacids (1870), Capture of Ani, the Capital of Armenia (1871), and Theatre or the Miserables (1871). Theatre or The Miserables takes on the issue of social injustice and moral decay. In the play two lovers commit suicide on stage. Had Tourian lived a longer life, he might have had opportunity to develop a more sophisticated theatrical repertoire. History remembers him more for his verse than his dramas, although the latter initially brought him fame during his lifetime.

Knowing that he would die young, he rode the roller coaster of emotion, complaining to the Almighty in one poem and beseeching forgiveness in another. Unrealized dreams and an anxiety to live to contribute to his nation caused him deep pain and sorrow, which are reflected in his writing.

The following poem, Little Lake, is an allusion to the fact that apparently Tourian who was in love with an actress, overheard her scornfully saying, “Oh him? He is trembling and so pale—he might even die one of those days!” (which, he did).

Sources 
K. B. Bardarkjian, A Reference Guide to Modern Armenian Literature 1500-1920,  Wayne State University Press, 1999
E. Jrbashian, “Petros Durian” (an article from Armenian Soviet Encyclopedia)
Hrand Nazariantz, Bedros Tourian, Poeta armeno: dalla sua vita e dalle sue pagine migliori, con un cenno sull'arte armena, in collaborazione con Franco Nitti Valentini, con una presentazione di Enrico Cardile, Bari, Laterza, 1915.
Bedros Tourian, I Miserabili: dramma in Cinque atti, versione italiana di Hrand Nazariantz; con prefazione di Alfredo Violante, Milano, Sonzogno, 1916.
J.R. Russell, Bosphorus Nights: The Complete Lyric Poems of Bedros Tourian: Translation, Introduction, and Commentary, Armenian Heritage Press, 2005

External links 

Petros Duryan in Amazon.com
Petros Duryan at ArmenianHouse.org
'Collected Works' by Bedros Tourian

Video 

1851 births
1872 deaths

Writers from Istanbul
Armenians from the Ottoman Empire
Armenian male poets
19th-century male writers
19th-century Armenian actors
19th-century Armenian dramatists and playwrights
19th-century deaths from tuberculosis
Tuberculosis deaths in the Ottoman Empire
Male actors from Istanbul